Darif Tanjaoui (born 1939) is a Moroccan gymnast. He competed in eight events at the 1960 Summer Olympics.

References

1939 births
Living people
Moroccan male artistic gymnasts
Olympic gymnasts of Morocco
Gymnasts at the 1960 Summer Olympics
Sportspeople from Casablanca